Lago de Babia (Astur-Leonese: Ḷḷau) is a locality located in the municipality of Cabrillanes, in León province, Castile and León, Spain. As of 2020, it has a population of 24.

Geography 
Lago de Babia is located 89km northwest of León, Spain.

References

Populated places in the Province of León